PCCE may refer to:

Padre Conceição College of Engineering, an engineering college in Verna, Goa
Partido Comunista de la Argentina (Congreso Extraordinario), a political party in Argentina